Elections were held in Bicol Region for seats in the House of Representatives of the Philippines on May 9, 2016.

Summary

Albay
Each of Albay's three legislative districts will elect each representative to the House of Representatives. The candidate with the highest number of votes wins the seat.

1st District
Edcel B. Lagman Jr. is the incumbent but not seeking for reelection. His party nominated his father and former congressman Edcel C. Lagman.

2nd District
Al Francis C. Bichara is the incumbent but ineligible for reelection due to term limit. He seeking for governorship instead.

3rd District
Fernando Gonzales is the incumbent.

Camarines Norte
Each of Camarines Norte's two legislative districts will elect each representative to the House of Representatives. The candidate with the highest number of votes wins the seat.

1st District
Catherine Barcelona-Reyes is the incumbent but not seeking for reelection. She is vying for governor instead.

2nd District
Elmer E. Panotes is the incumbent but died on September 16, 2015. His wife, Marisol is the party's nominee.

Camarines Sur
Each of Camarines Sur's five legislative districts will elect each representative to the House of Representatives. The candidate with the highest number of votes wins the seat.

1st District
Rolando Andaya, Jr. is the incumbent.

2nd District
Diosdado Ignacio M. Arroyo is term limited, his party nominate Asuncion Arceño, which run against Former Governor LRay Villafuerte.

3rd District
Neophyte congresswoman Maria Leonor Robredo is the incumbent but not seeking for reelection. She is vying for vice-president of the country instead.

4th District
Felix William Fuentebella is the incumbent but not seeking for reelection. His party nominated his father and former congressman Arnulfo Fuentebella.

5th District
Salvio B. Fortuno is the incumbent.

Catanduanes
Cesar V. Sarmiento is the incumbent.

Masbate
Each of Masbate's three legislative districts will elect each representative to the House of Representatives. The candidate with the highest number of votes wins the seat

1st District
Ma. Vida V. Espinosa-Bravo is the incumbent.

2nd District
Elisa T. Kho is the incumbent.

3rd District
Scott Davies S. Lanete is the incumbent.

Sorsogon
Each of Sorsogon's two legislative districts will elect each representative to the House of Representatives. The candidate with the highest number of votes wins the seat.

1st District
Evelina G. Escudero is the incumbent and running unopposed.

2nd District
Deogracias B. Ramos Jr. is the incumbent.

References

External links
Official COMELEC results 2016
COMELEC - Official website of the Philippine Commission on Elections (COMELEC)
NAMFREL - Official website of National Movement for Free Elections (NAMFREL)
PPCRV - Official website of the Parish Pastoral Council for Responsible Voting (PPCRV)

2016 Philippine general election
Lower house elections in the Bicol Region